Matilda of Boulogne (1170 – 16 October 1210) was the younger daughter of Matthew, Count of Boulogne, and Marie I, Countess of Boulogne. Matilda became Duchess of Brabant by her marriage to Henry I, Duke of Brabant.

Matilda's parents' marriage was annulled the year she was born and her mother became a Benedictine nun at St. Austrebert, Montreuil and died in 1182. Matilde's father continued to reign as Count of Boulogne until his death in 1173, when her older sister Ida became countess.

Matilda married Henry I, Duke of Brabant, in 1180. The couple went on to have:
 Maria (c. 1190 – May 1260), married in Maastricht after 19 May 1214 Otto IV, Holy Roman Emperor, married July 1220 Count William I of Holland
 Adelaide (b. c. 1190), married 1206 Arnold III, Count of Loos, married 3 February 1225  (c. 1195–1247), married before 21 April 1251 Arnold van Wesemaele (d. aft. 1288)
 Margaret (1192–1231), married January 1206 Gerard III, Count of Guelders (d. 22 October 1229)
 Mathilde (c. 1200 – 22 December 1267), married in Aachen in 1212 Henry II, Count Palatine of the Rhine (d. 1214), married on 6 December 1214 Floris IV, Count of Holland
 Henry II of Brabant (1207–1248), married firstly before 22 August 1215 Marie of Hohenstaufen; married secondly in 1240 Sophie of Thuringia
 Godfrey (1209 – 21 January 1254), Lord of Gaesbeek, married Maria van Oudenaarde
 child, whose name and sex is unknown

Matilde died in 1210 or 1211. She was buried at St. Peter's in Leuven.

Ancestry

References

Sources

1170 births
1210 deaths
Duchesses of Brabant
House of Metz
House of Reginar
Burials at St. Peter's Church, Leuven
12th-century French nobility
12th-century French women
12th-century French people
13th-century French nobility
13th-century French women
12th-century German nobility
12th-century German women
13th-century German nobility
13th-century German women